A bus mouse is a variety of PC computer mouse which is attached to the computer using a specialized interface (originally, the Microsoft InPort interface developed for Microsoft's original mouse product).

In the late 1980s, mice were not integrated with IBM-compatible personal computers, and the specialized bus interface (implemented via an ISA add-in card) was one of two popular ways to connect a mouse; serial interfaces were the other method. In addition to Microsoft, Logitech also made bus mouse interface cards.

When the IBM PS/2 was introduced, it included a motherboard mouse interface which was integrated with the keyboard controller (still called the PS/2 mouse interface long after the PS/2 brand was withdrawn); this fairly quickly drove the bus mouse design out of the marketplace.

The bus mouse lived on in the NEC PC-98 family of personal computers in Japan.

See also
 BIOS interrupt call
 PS/2 port
 USB

Further reading

External links
  

Computer mice
Legacy hardware